Hatsal Youth Ministry Institute(햇살청소년사목센터) is a Catholic organization in South Korea providing formation for people working in youth ministry as well as research on topics related to youth ministry and a network for the Catholic youth ministries in South Korea. Hatsal is a member of the umbrella of Catholic youth organizations Fimcap.

References

Catholic youth organizations
Youth organizations based in South Korea
Fimcap
Catholic Church in South Korea